Moonshine Lake Provincial Park is a provincial park located in Alberta, Canada.

Located 27 km west and 7 km north of Spirit River, on Highway 49.

External links
Discover the Peace Country - Moonshine Lake
Park page at Alberta Development

Provincial parks of Alberta
Saddle Hills County